The 2001 CSKA season was the club's tenth season in the Russian Top Division, the highest tier of association football in Russia.

Squad

Transfers

Winter

In:

Out:

Summer

In:

Out:

Competitions

Top Division

Results by round

Results

Table

Russian Cup

2001-02

Quarterfinal took place during the 2002 season.

Squad Statistics

Appearances and goals

|-
|colspan="14"|Players out on loan:

|-
|colspan="14"|Players who left CSKA Moscow during the season:

|}

Goal Scorers

Disciplinary Record

References

PFC CSKA Moscow seasons
CSKA Moscow